The Beechcraft Premier I is a light business jet aircraft manufactured by the Beechcraft division of Hawker Beechcraft. The aircraft was designed to compete with the Cessna CitationJet series of aircraft.

Development
Design of the Premier I began early in 1994 under the designation PD-374 (PD for Preliminary Design), and development was authorized to continue early the following year. The aircraft was officially launched at the annual National Business Aviation Association Convention in September 1995 and construction of the first prototype commenced late in 1996.
In the mid-1990s, the light jet was to be priced at $5 million.

The Premier I prototype was rolled out on 19 August 1998 and its first flight was on 22 December 1998; four prototypes were used in the flight test program. Its FAA Type Certificate was issued on 23 March 2001.
After development delays, the aircraft entered service in 2001 but with poor runway performance, erratic lift dump and brakes, a noisy cabin and substandard cockpit.
It was upgraded as the Premier IA in 2006 for $7 million with better brakes, avionics and cabin, and 163 were built in five years.
It was certified on 22 September 2005.

In 2018, used aircraft from 2003 to 2011 were priced at $1.28 to 2.4 million.

Premier II/Hawker 200

On 19 May 2008, Hawker Beechcraft announced the launch of the Premier II. Developed from the Premier IA, the new aircraft would feature higher cruise speeds, a 20% longer range with four passengers, and increased payload.  The aircraft would continue to feature composite materials for the fuselage, and have more powerful engines and new winglets to achieve performance improvements over the previous model.  First flight was scheduled for April 2009, with FAA certification planned for the first half of 2010. Hawker Beechcraft claimed to have received orders for over 70 new Premier IIs.

On 31 August 2009, the company indicated that it was slowing development of the Premier II, moving its first delivery date into late 2012 or early 2013 due to the poor market for business aircraft. Company  Chairman and CEO Bill Boisture stated: "While we remain fully committed to certifying and fielding the class-leading Premier II as designed, we must be prudent in our evaluation of the current and forecasted global economic environment. Based on these conditions, we have made the decision to extend the entry-into-service date to better align with anticipated rebound of the business jet market."

In October 2010, Hawker Beechcraft announced that the Premier II had rebranded and upgraded as the Hawker 200.

In December 2011 the company announced that it was slowing down development of the Hawker 200 jet due to the uncertain state of the economy. CEO Bill Boisture indicated the program was not canceled, saying that the aircraft program is "well positioned to continue...when the time is right."

After the bankruptcy of Hawker Beechcraft, the production of business jets ceased in 2013.

Design
The Premier I is constructed with a high-strength composite, carbon fiber/epoxy honeycomb structure fuselage. The Premier I and IA can be certified as light aircraft for operation by a single pilot. The powerplants are Williams International FJ44-2A engines.

Engine maintenance is budgeted for $300 per hour for both (2019), with 2,500 hour hot section inspections and 5,000 hour TBOs.
Competition used include the CJ2 and the Nextant 400XT, both have tighter cabins but better airfield performance, the CJ2 can fly four passengers over  but is  slower and around $1 million more expensive, while the 400XT can fly  for the same value but are usually high-time jets.

Variants
Premier I - basic version, introduced in 2001.
Premier IA - new cabin interior and improved systems.

Specifications (Premier IA)

See also

References

External links

 Beechcraft Premier IA website

1990s United States business aircraft
Premier
Twinjets
Low-wing aircraft
T-tail aircraft
Aircraft first flown in 1998